White Shadows may refer to:

 White Shadows (song), a song by Coldplay
 White Shadows (film), a 1951 West German drama film